Charles John Luken (born July 18, 1951, in Cincinnati, Ohio) is an American politician of the Democratic party who was mayor of Cincinnati, Ohio, and served in the Ohio's 1st congressional district in the United States House of Representatives. Luken, who is divorced, has three children. When Luken left office at the end of 2005, he was the longest serving mayor in Cincinnati's history with 12 years and one month of service in that role.

Early career 
Luken earned a Bachelor of Arts degree from the University of Notre Dame (Indiana) in 1973. He then entered law school at the University of Cincinnati College of Law, earning his degree in 1976, after which he started practicing law.

Rejected by the Democratic party as a successor to his uncle, Jim Luken, Luken first ran for the council as an independent, losing the at-large race in 1979. Luken served on the Cincinnati city council from 1981 to 1984, before becoming mayor. Luken served as mayor of Cincinnati from 1984 to 1990. In 1985 Luken sponsored an amendment to the City's charter that made the leading vote-getter in the council race the City's mayor. Under that system Luken was elected mayor in 1985, 1987 and 1989.

In 1990, Luken's father, Tom Luken, a U.S. representative from Ohio, decided to retire. Charlie then ran for a seat in Ohio's District 1 in the United States House of Representatives to replace his father. Luken won the election, defeating another former Cincinnati mayor, Ken Blackwell. Luken began serving in the U.S. House in 1991 (102nd Congress). He declined to run for re-election in 1992.

Returning from Washington, Luken served as a news anchor at WLWT-TV from 1993 to 1999, the same Cincinnati station where ex-mayor Jerry Springer and Luken's father's onetime political opponent Tom Atkins had worked as news anchors. One of Luken's colleagues was future political opponent Courtis Fuller. In that role, Luken's newscasts at WLW-TV were awarded best newscast in Ohio on two occasions.

Cincinnati's first "strong mayor" 
After a change in the Cincinnati city charter that made the mayoralty a separately-elected office and established a "strong-mayor" form of government, Luken returned to politics. In 1999, he again took over the office of mayor of Cincinnati. In his first return term as mayor, Luken had to deal with the 2001 Cincinnati Riots resulting from perceived racism on the part of city police, as evidenced by a pattern of racial profiling and the shooting deaths of several unarmed black men.

In 2001, Luken won a second term against his former co-anchor Fuller (a Democrat running as a Charterite).

Fuller, a popular black anchorman for a local network station, was running at the same time Cincinnati was still dealing with the fallout of the riots, the racial discord highlighted by the continuing Cincinnati boycott by black celebrities and national organizations. The Hamilton County, Ohio, Board of Elections initially questioned the validity of Fuller's campaign because he had moved into the city only just before declaring his candidacy. Luken, however, discouraged the board from its inquiry, stating that it would be bad for the city if he had no opponent for re-election, as the Republican party had failed to field a candidate for the office of mayor. Fuller beat Luken by 54-38 percent in the nonpartisan primary held September 11, 2001. However, the infamous terrorist attacks in New York City and Washington, D.C., that happened the day of the primary overshadowed Fuller's victory.

In the general election, Luken managed to beat Fuller. Luken's margin was slightly over 10 percent, meaning an 18 point primary defeat was reversed into a 10 percent victory for Luken in just eight weeks. The voting followed race lines, with Fuller receiving 78 percent of the vote in predominantly black voting wards, while Luken received approximately 80 percent of the votes in predominantly white wards. With more whites than blacks in Cincinnati, this racial split gave Luken the win.

Withdrawal from politics 
In August 2004, Luken announced he would not seek re-election to a third term. In September 2004, he briefly flirted with running for Hamilton County Prosecuting Attorney as a write-in candidate because scandal plagued incumbent Michael K. Allen had no opponent. Luken reactivated his dormant law license but ultimately decided not to run.

The election race for his successor was narrowed down to two candidates after the primary run: first-term councilman David Pepper (son of John Pepper, former CEO of Procter & Gamble) and Mark Mallory, a member of the state Senate. With the previous election following the city's racial divides so closely, the race of the candidates — Pepper is white, Mallory is black — was considered significant. Both candidates were members of the Ohio Democratic Party.
Mallory was elected Luken's successor on November 8, 2005.

A few days after the riots in April of 2001, Luken requested the United States Justice Department review the policies and practices of The Cincinnati Police Department. The result was The Cincinnati Collaborative Agreement, a wide ranging change in police policies and practices that has become a national model of community engagement in policing.

In 2004 Luken founded the nonprofit development corporation known as The Center City development Corporation (3CDC), and that organization is widely credited with bringing a resurgence to Cincinnati's urban core.

Also in 2004, Luken made repeal of Article 12 (a law prohibiting the City from passing any legislation advancing LGBTQ rights) a central part of the City's agenda in his State of the City speech. That November the citizens of Cincinnati repealed Article 12.

Luken has also chaired the Ohio State Racing Commission (2006-2010) and is currently the chairman of The Cincinnati Port Authority (cincinnatiport.org).

See also 
 List of United States representatives from Ohio

External links

1951 births
Living people
Mayors of Cincinnati
Television anchors from Cincinnati
University of Notre Dame alumni
University of Cincinnati College of Law alumni
Democratic Party members of the United States House of Representatives from Ohio
Members of Congress who became lobbyists